Be Sick... It's Free is a 1968 Italian comedy film directed by Luigi Zampa and starring Alberto Sordi. A sequel was made titled Il Prof. Dott. Guido Tersilli, primario della clinica Villa Celeste, convenzionata con le mutue.

Plot
Dr. Guido Tersilli finds himself in the hospital for a nervous breakdown. In fact, this is due to the disproportionate number of patients that the doctor had at his studio. However, a few months before this event Guido was a different person. He was just a simple pediatrician of Rome who performed a few visits for children. But the mother planned for him a great future as a doctor, and taught him to play dirty hospital where Guido worked to gain more customers can be borrowed. Mutual is an association that gave the Italians the State contribution for care by doctors, in Italy the period of maximum growth was precisely that of the sixties in which doctors and primary clinics trying to accumulate for their many customers who had to scrape together more money mutual. Tersilli from a simple pediatrician starts to become a real doctor raking here and there with mutual customers. The turning point occurs when Guido is called by a rich lady to visit her husband. Guido takes just a chance to woo the woman, although he was already engaged to another girl to bring her into his list of patients borrowed. So Guido, under the envy of colleagues, start earning with the rich lady countless customers borrowed touching the 2000 patients. However Guido fails for a long time to heal all the stress due to the ongoing work of the cause exhaustion. In the hospital Guido finds himself face to face with his enemies colleagues who decide to take care of him but stealing a portion of the best clients with mutual. Then Guido Tersilli continue to see patients but staying in bed and talking by phone.

Cast
 Alberto Sordi as Dr. Guido Tersilli
 Sara Franchetti as Teresa
 Evelyn Stewart as Anna Maria 
 Nanda Primavera as Tersilli's Mother
 Bice Valori as Amelia, the Widow
 Leopoldo Trieste as Pietro
 Franco Scandurra as Dr. Bui
 Claudio Gora as The Chief Physician
 Pupella Maggio as Mrs. Parise
 Franco Gelli as One of Tersilli's Colleagues
 Tano Cimarosa as Laganà
 Sandro Merli as Dr. Drufo
 Marisa Traversi as The Prostitute
 Sandro Dori as Doctor Zucconi-Colleague in hospital

Reception
The film was the highest-grossing film in Italy of the 1968-69 season, with a gross of more than 1 billion lira ($1.6 million) from 16 key cities.

References

External links

1968 films
1960s Italian-language films
Films directed by Luigi Zampa
1968 comedy films
Films set in Rome
Medical-themed films
Italian comedy films
1960s Italian films